The MacArthur Monument is a monument in Los Angeles' MacArthur Park, in the U.S. state of California. The statue of Douglas MacArthur was completed by Roger Noble Burnham and the memorial was designed by Harold Field Kellogg. The monument was vandalized in the 1980s and surveyed by the Smithsonian Institution's "Save Outdoor Sculpture!" program in 1995.

References

External links

 

Monuments and memorials in Los Angeles
Outdoor sculptures in Greater Los Angeles
Sculptures of men in California
Statues in Los Angeles
Westlake, Los Angeles
Cultural depictions of Douglas MacArthur
Monuments and memorials to Douglas MacArthur
Vandalized works of art in California